, known commonly as Fuku-Ari (フクアリ), is a football stadium in Chiba, Japan. It was completed in 2005 and is home to the J. League club JEF United Ichihara Chiba following their move from the Ichihara Seaside Stadium. The stadium has a capacity for 19,781 spectators, with 18,500 seats.

Originally named , Fukuda Denshi, a medical electric instrument manufacturer, won the naming rights after outbidding several other candidates.

The location is a former Kawasaki Steel factory site.

The first international match was held on 29 May 2009, when the men's national teams of Belgium and Chile played out a 1–1 draw.

References

External links

Official website

Football venues in Japan
Rugby union stadiums in Japan
Rugby in Kantō
JEF United Chiba
Sports venues in Chiba (city)
Venues of the 2026 Asian Games
Sports venues completed in 2005
2005 establishments in Japan